Cremoso (in Spanish, creamy) is a semi-soft Argentine cheese made with cow's milk, with or without the addition of cream. It derives from Italian cheeses with similar characteristics as Crescenza.

It is the most consumed cheese in Argentina and represents almost 40% of domestic production of cheese. From its origin as a companion of quince or Dulce de batata, its uses have evolved and now is used for making pizzas as a substitute for mozzarella.

It is a soft white cheese, with 45-55% water. It has no rind, and is presented in vacuum-sealed parallelepiped packages.

See also
List of cheeses

References

Argentine cheeses
Cow's-milk cheeses